Lefkothea may refer to several settlements in Greece:

 Lefkothea, Ioannina
 Lefkothea, Kozani
 Lefkothea, Serres